Frank Defays (born 23 February 1974, in Namur) is a retired Belgian football defender and currently assistant manager of Charleroi in the Belgian First Division A.

He played for Belgian clubs R.E.S. Jambes (1980-1988), UR Namur (1988-1999) and Charleroi (1999-2009), and for F91 Dudelange (2009–2010) of Luxembourg.

References

External links 
 
 

1974 births
Living people
Belgian footballers
Belgian football managers
R. Charleroi S.C. players
Union Royale Namur Fosses-La-Ville players
Belgian Pro League players
Belgian Pro League managers
Sportspeople from Namur (city)
Association football defenders
Footballers from Namur (province)